Adventures of Krosh is a 1961 Soviet adventure film directed by Genrikh Oganisyan based on the book by Anatoly Rybakov.

Plot 
A group of former ninth-graders carpool to their summer internship at a motor depot that sponsors their school. They quickly get involved in work and spend time with benefits. But Seryozha Krasheninnikov (Krosh), having no technical inclinations, feels out of place. The boys decide to fix a decommissioned car but parts keep on disappearing, leading to a series of unfortunate events. Krosh begins to play the role of a detective.

Cast 
 Nikolai Tomashevsky as Krosh
 Andrei Yurenyov as Igor
 Nikita Mikhalkov as Vadim
 I. Pogrebenko as Shmakov
 V. Beliakova as Maika
 E. Loginova as Nadya
 V. Sukhanov as Polekutin
 M. Sysuev as Taranov
 Svetlana Balashova as Vera Semechkina (as S. Balashova)
 Nikolay Parfyonov as Vladimir Georgiyevich

References

External links 
 

1961 films
1960s Russian-language films
Soviet teen films